Jonathan Blum may refer to:

Jonathan Blum (writer, born 1972), American writer, known for Doctor Who
Jonathan Blum (writer, born 1967), American writer
Jonathon Blum (born 1989), American ice hockey player

See also
John Blum (born 1959), American ice hockey player
John Morton Blum (1921–2011), American political historian